Víctor Antonio Santiago Negrón, known as Víctor (born February 5, 1983, in Villalba, Puerto Rico) is a Puerto Rican singer, host, and actor. He is known for being one of the finalists of the fourth season of reality/talent show Objetivo Fama'.

Career

Víctor grew up in Villalba, Puerto Rico. Early in his career, he sang choirs for Las Nenas del Swing. Later, he was a member of merengue groups Mambo and Karís.

In 2007, he was selected to be a contestant in the fourth season of Objetivo Fama, a Puerto Rican reality/talent show. Víctor was a consistent competitor and ended up in third place in the competition. During his stay in the show, Víctor performed the following songs:

After Objetivo Fama, Víctor began working on his first album which was released on November 20, 2007, under the title Desesperados. The album spawned a hit single titled "Salvajemente Enamorada". In 2009, he released his second album titled La Medida del Amor. In July 2013, Víctor headlined a show dedicated to boleros held at the National Foundation of Popular Culture at Old San Juan.

Aside of his music career, Víctor has been acting in theater and plays. He also co-hosted, along with Jose Figueroa, the TV show ASF (first called Adrenalina Sin Frenos'') which aired on Univision Puerto Rico.

Personal life

Victor married Yizette Cifredo in a private ceremony on November 24, 2012. Their first daughter, Eva Santiago Cifredo, was born in April 2014.

Discography

References

1983 births
Living people
People from Villalba, Puerto Rico
21st-century Puerto Rican male singers